Dyscia is a genus of moths in the family Geometridae erected by Jacob Hübner in 1825.

Species
 Dyscia atlantica Reisser, 1933
 Dyscia conspersaria (Denis & Schiffermüller, 1775)
 Dyscia crassipunctaria (Rebel, 1916)
 Dyscia distinctaria (Bang-Haas, 1910)
 Dyscia dodonaeeti Wiltshire, 1986
 Dyscia fagaria (Thunberg, 1784) – grey scalloped bar
 Dyscia galactaria Turati, 1934
 Dyscia holli (Oberthür, 1910)
 Dyscia innocentaria (Christoph, 1885)
 Dyscia lentiscaria (Donzel, 1837)
 Dyscia leucogrammaria (Püngeler, 1900)
 Dyscia malatyana Wehrli, 1934
 Dyscia negrama Wehrli, 1953
 Dyscia nobiliaria (A. Bang-Haas, 1906)
 Dyscia penulataria (Hübner, 1819)
 Dyscia plebejaria (Oberthür, 1910)
 Dyscia raunaria (Freyer, 1851)
 Dyscia royaria Tautel & Billi, 2006
 Dyscia rungsi Herbulot, 1981
 Dyscia simplicaria Rebel, 1933

References

 
Aspitatini